Hope is an unincorporated community in Somerset Township, Steele County, Minnesota, United States. Hope has a post office with ZIP code 56046.

Geography
The community is located between Ellendale and Owatonna near Interstate 35 and Steele County Road 4. Nearby places include Ellendale, Owatonna, Blooming Prairie, and Bixby. Hope is seven miles north of Ellendale, and 11 miles south of Owatonna.  The Straight River is nearby.

History
Hope had a depot on the Chicago, Rock Island and Pacific Railroad. A post office called Hope has been in operation since 1916.

References

Unincorporated communities in Minnesota
Unincorporated communities in Steele County, Minnesota